People Are Different is an album by Canadian indie rock band Wooden Stars, released in 2007 on Sonic Unyon. It is the band's first new album since 1999's Julie Doiron and the Wooden Stars.

Track listing
 "Orphans"
 "Pretty Girl"
 "Blackouts"
 "Microphone"
 "Gold Dust"
 "Boating Accident"
 "Last Secret Infirmary"
 "Clouds"

2007 albums
Wooden Stars albums
Sonic Unyon Records albums